Chrysogonus (Golden birth) was the name of the following people in Ancient Greece and Rome:

 Chrysogonus of Athens flutist and poet (~407 BC)
 Chrysogonus of Macedon nobleman and general of Philip V of Macedon, father of poet Samus)
 Lucius Cornelius Chrysogonus
 Saint Chrysogonus